Peter McNulty may refer to:

 Peter McNulty (film editor), film editor
 Peter McNulty (Gaelic footballer) (1985–2010), Gaelic footballer
 Peter H. McNulty, merchant, real estate operator and politician in New York